Ivan Bošnjak (born 6 February 1979) is a Croatian retired professional footballer who played as a forward. He spent most of his career playing for boyhood club HNK Cibalia, Dinamo Zagreb and Hajduk Split in his native Croatia, as well as Genk in Belgium and Chongqing Lifan in China.

Club career
Bošnjak started his professional career at local club HNK Cibalia in the 1996–97 season. He went on to move to Hajduk Split in 2000 and left the club after two seasons for Al-Ittihad Tripoli from Libya, where he spent a season without getting a chance to make a single appearance in an official match. He came back to Croatia by signing with Dinamo Zagreb in 2004. At the club level, he had his biggest personal successes while being named the best player of the Croatian First League in 2000 and becoming the league's top goalscorer in 2006 with 22 goals scored. He transferred to China League One club Chongqing Lifan at season 2011. In March 2012, Bošnjak joined Rijeka. It is reported that Bošnjak has agreed to terms with Brunei's DPMM FC on a transfer in February 2013. on 2014 Bošnjak has agreed to terms with Persija Jakarta.

International career
Bošnjak played for the Croatian national team and collected a total of 14 international caps in which he managed to score one goal. He made his debut for the Croatian team in their friendly match against Slovakia on 16 August 2000 in Bratislava, but subsequently made only one more appearance for the team over a timespan of more than four years before eventually becoming their regular member in 2005 by making six appearances in the 2006 FIFA World Cup qualifying. He went on to score his first goal for Croatia in their friendly match against Hong Kong at the 2006 Carlsberg Cup in Hong Kong and was then also selected to be part of the Croatian squad at the 2006 World Cup finals in Germany, but played at the tournament for only four minutes of regular time in Croatia's second group match against Japan.

International appearances

Honours

Club
Cibalia
Croatian Second League: 1997–98 (East)

Hajduk Split
Croatian First League: 2000–01

Al-Ittihad Tripoli
Libyan Premier League: 2002-03
Libyan Super Cup: 2002

Dinamo Zagreb
Croatian First League: 2005–06
Croatian Cup: 2004

Genk
Belgian Cup: 2009

Individual
SN Yellow Shirt Award: 2000
Heart of Hajduk Award: 2001
Croatian First League Top Scorer: 2006

References

External links
 

1979 births
Living people
Sportspeople from Vinkovci
Association football forwards
Croatian footballers
Croatia under-21 international footballers
Croatia international footballers
2006 FIFA World Cup players
HNK Cibalia players
HNK Hajduk Split players
Al-Ittihad Club (Tripoli) players
GNK Dinamo Zagreb players
K.R.C. Genk players
Iraklis Thessaloniki F.C. players
Chongqing Liangjiang Athletic F.C. players
HNK Rijeka players
DPMM FC players
Persija Jakarta players
Croatian Football League players
Libyan Premier League players
Belgian Pro League players
Super League Greece players
China League One players
Indonesian Super League players
Croatian expatriate footballers
Expatriate footballers in Libya
Croatian expatriate sportspeople in Libya
Expatriate footballers in Belgium
Croatian expatriate sportspeople in Belgium
Expatriate footballers in Greece
Croatian expatriate sportspeople in Greece
Expatriate footballers in China
Croatian expatriate sportspeople in China
Expatriate footballers in Brunei
Expatriate footballers in Indonesia
Croatian expatriate sportspeople in Indonesia